Kenneth or Ken Woodward may refer to:
 Kenneth Woodward (cricketer), English cricketer
 Kenneth L. Woodward, American Roman Catholic writer
 Ken Woodward (health and safety), awarded an OBE for work in health and safety
 Ken Woodward (footballer), English footballer